Filmworks XXIII: El General is a film score by American composer John Zorn for Natalia Almada's documentary El General which depicts Mexican politician Plutarco Elías Calles. It is the twenty-third album of Zorn's Filmworks series.

Reception

The Allmusic review by Anthony Tognazzini stated "Working with instrumentation that includes accordion, bass, marimba, and guitar, the score folds traditional Mexican folk into an avant-chamber context, creating an evocative soundtrack that is atmospheric and, in keeping with Zorn’s aesthetic, thoroughly creative". All About Jazz reviewer Warren Allen noted "Within these cues, Zorn's distinct and wonderful touch is at work, pulling the different sounds, feelings, colors, etc... into something that exists unto itself, without needing a genre or a film to give it clarity, perspective, and meaning". The Free Jazz Collective stated "It's always a pleasure to hear these four musicians play, and regardless of the subgenre, they usually have something new to bring as they do here. Nice, but not essential".

Track listing 
All compositions by John Zorn

Personnel
 Rob Burger − piano, accordion
 Greg Cohen − double bass
 Marc Ribot − electric guitar, acoustic guitar
 Kenny Wollesen − drums, vibraphone, bass marimba

References

Tzadik Records soundtracks
Albums produced by John Zorn
John Zorn soundtracks
2008 soundtrack albums
Film scores